Dmitri Pavlovich Rebrov (born 2 October 1997) is a Russian football player. He plays for FC Yenisey Krasnoyarsk.

Club career
He made his debut in the Russian Professional Football League for FSK Dolgoprudny on 30 April 2017 in a game against FC Volga Tver.

He played in all games in the 2019–20 Russian Cup campaign for FC Luch Vladivostok, in which Luch eliminated Premier League club FC Dynamo Moscow and Rebrov kept a clean sheet, before falling to another Premier League club FC Akhmat Grozny with a score of 1–5.

References

External links
 Profile by Russian Professional Football League

1997 births
Footballers from Moscow
Living people
Russian footballers
Association football goalkeepers
FC Olimp-Dolgoprudny players
FC Luch Vladivostok players
FC Yenisey Krasnoyarsk players
Russian First League players
Russian Second League players